This article displays the rosters for the teams competing at the EuroBasket Women 2013. Each team had to submit 12 players.

Group A

Montenegro
The roster was announced on 14 June 2013.

|}
| valign="top" |
 Head coach

 Assistant coaches

Legend
Club – describes lastclub before the tournament
Age – describes ageon 15 June 2013
|}

Slovakia
The roster was announced on 4 June 2013.

|}
| valign="top" |
 Head coach

Legend
Club – describes lastclub before the tournament
Age – describes ageon 15 June 2013
|}

Turkey
The roster was announced on 7 June 2013.

|}
| valign="top" |
 Head coach

 Assistant coach

Legend
 (C) Team captain
 Club field describes current club
|}

Ukraine
The roster was announced on 13 June 2013.

|}
| valign="top" |
 Head coach

Legend
Club – describes lastclub before the tournament
Age – describes ageon 15 June 2013
|}

Group B

Italy
The roster was announced on 12 June 2013.

|}
| valign="top" |
 Head coach

 Assistant coaches

Legend
Club – describes lastclub before the tournament
Age – describes ageon 15 June 2013
|}

Russia
The roster was announced on 12 June 2013.

|}
| valign="top" |
 Head coach

Legend
Club – describes lastclub before the tournament
Age – describes ageon 15 June 2013
|}

Spain
The roster was announced on 10 June 2013.

|}
| valign="top" |
 Head coach

 Assistant coaches

Legend
Club – describes lastclub before the tournament
Age – describes ageon 15 June 2013
|}

Sweden
The roster was announced on 3 June 2013.

|}
| valign="top" |
 Head coach

 Assistant coaches

Legend
Club – describes lastclub before the tournament
Age – describes ageon 15 June 2013
|}

Group C

France
The roster was announced on 14 June 2013.

|}
| valign="top" |
 Head coach

 Assistant coaches

Legend
Club – describes lastclub before the tournament
Age – describes ageon 15 June 2013
|}

Great Britain
The roster was announced on 11 June 2013.

|}
| valign="top" |
 Head coach

 Assistant coaches

Legend
Club – describes lastclub before the tournament
Age – describes ageon 15 June 2013
|}

Latvia
The roster was announced on 5 June 2013.

|}
| valign="top" |
 Head coach

 Assistant coaches

Legend
Club – describes lastclub before the tournament
Age – describes ageon 15 June 2013
|}

Serbia
The roster was announced on 11 June 2013.

|}
| valign="top" |
 Head coach

 Assistant coaches

Legend
Club – describes lastclub before the tournament
Age – describes ageon 15 June 2013
|}

Group D

Belarus
The roster was announced on 9 June 2013.

|}
| valign="top" |
 Head coach

 Assistant coaches

Legend
Club – describes lastclub before the tournament
Age – describes ageon 15 June 2013
|}

Croatia
The roster was announced on 12 June 2013.

|}
| valign="top" |
 Head coach

Legend
Club – describes lastclub before the tournament
Age – describes ageon 15 June 2013
|}

Czech Republic
The roster was announced on 9 June 2013.

|}
| valign="top" |
 Head coach

 Assistant coaches

Legend
Club – describes lastclub before the tournament
Age – describes ageon 15 June 2013
|}

Lithuania
The roster was announced on 4 June 2013.

|}
| valign="top" |
 Head coach

Legend
Club – describes lastclub before the tournament
Age – describes ageon 15 June 2013
|}

References

External links
 FIBA Archive

EuroBasket Women 2013
EuroBasket Women squads